Stuart Thomas Forster (born 12 February 1969) is a former New Zealand rugby union player. He was a member of the New Zealand national side, the All Blacks, from 1993 to 1995, appearing in 12 matches including six internationals.

Forster played rugby for Otago in the amateur days and worked as the assistant grounds man at Carisbrook.

References

1969 births
Living people
People from Pahiatua
People educated at Napier Boys' High School
New Zealand international rugby union players
New Zealand rugby union players
Māori All Blacks players
Hawke's Bay rugby union players
Highlanders (rugby union) players
Otago rugby union players
Rugby union scrum-halves
Rugby union players from Manawatū-Whanganui